Alijaniis a Persian surname and may refer to:
Reza Alijani, Iranian journalist, writer and nationalist-religious activist
B. Alijani, Iranian meteorologist 
Neda Alijani, Iranian infectious disease physician 
Mohammad Alidjani-Momer, Iranian sports shooter
Mohsen Alijani-Zamani, Iranian physician and reformist politician